Love in the dock (Arabic: حب في قفص الاتهام, Hob Fi Kafas El Itiham) is an Algerian television soap opera directed by Bachir Sellami. Broadcast from 18 June to 16 July 2015, the show aired on the channel A3 on Télévision Algérienne. The show aired during Ramadan, the month of fasting and religious observance in Islam.

Premise 
The series follows Yasmine, a young woman from a respectable, conservative Algerian family. Yasmine travels to the United States to complete her education, but ends up marrying a member of the Algerian American community and becomes pregnant. She returns to Algeria, hiding her marriage and pregnancy from her family.

Cast 

 Sara Lalama as Yasmine, (2015)
 Amel Himer as Zainab, Yasmine's mother (2015)
 Mohamed Adjaimi as Hussein, Yasmine's father (2015)
 Bahia Rachedi
 Ammar ?
 Sikritir Mimouni as Tariq
 Mustapha Laribi
 Abdel Nour Ba'omar as Riad
 Louisa Arpag
 Vezah Tokorta
 Nawal Fayza
 Noureddine Boussouf
 Jamal Awan
 Zakaria bin Mohammed
 Amal Hanifa
 Suha Oolhy

Release 
The show was released on 18 June 2015 on the channel A3.

References 

2010s Algerian television series
2015 Algerian television series debuts
2015 Algerian television series endings
Arabic-language television shows
Television series about families
Television series about marriage
Television shows filmed in Algeria
2010s television soap operas
Public Establishment of Television original programming